ApplianSys, founded in 2000, is a privately held venture capital-backed technology company based in Coventry, United Kingdom. It designs, builds and markets Internet server appliances that are deployed in more than 150 countries. Forrester Research have listed ApplianSys as being a key vendor in the worldwide IP Address Management market, with its DNS engine used in a third of all GPRS networks.

Products
ApplianSys' portfolio of appliances include more than 20 models split across a range including DNSBOX (DNS, DHCP and IP Address Management), CACHEBOX (Web cache, Proxy Server, WAN Optimization and Content Filtering) and EDUGATEBOX (Gateway (telecommunications) appliance for schools that are connecting to the internet for the first time).

DNSBOX
The DNSBOX range was launched in 2001. It is divided into 4 series:

Management appliances use a combination of open source and proprietary software, developed by ApplianSys and Nixu.

According to IDC's 2007 IPAM report the average DNSBOX customer manages 15,000 IP addresses.

CACHEbox

CACHEBOX is a dedicated web caching proxy appliance with software editions targeted at Education, SME, Corporate/Governmental and ISP markets. Five models provide different performance levels:

 420 offers the highest performance and storage in the range with support for more than 6,000 HTTP requests per second. CACHEBOX420 is typically used by ISP networks or in the core of large enterprise/school networks, often as part of a distributed caching service with smaller units deployed closer to users. 
 310 offers high performance and storage with support for more than 3,600 HTTP requests per second. CACHEBOX310 is typically used by ISP networks or in large enterprise/school networks. 
 210 and 230 models are high performance 1U rackmount appliances used primarily in ISP networks and medium-large schools. They employ technologies such as Solid State Drives to support more than 2,500 HTTP requests per second. Multiple devices can be clustered together (using protocols such as Cisco's WCCP) for high availability and scalability.
 050 and 100 models are used by schools, ships, branch and small to medium-sized offices. Each support 400 HTTP requests per second and can connect to larger caching appliances upstream or operate independently.

CACHEBOX's caching engine employs code from the Squid project.

Customer types include:

 ISP: Through discontinuation of NetApp's NetCache in 2006 and Packeteer's product line in 2008, Blue Coat's ProxySG is not only a cache, but also a UTM, P2P control and WAN acceleration appliance. The addition of such features (that are more aimed at the corporate market and of limited use to ISPs) have increased the cost per URL/sec that can be cached. Conversely; CACHEbox is one of the only dedicated caches still available.
 SME: CACHEBOX's use is widespread in developing nations where bandwidth is costly and scarce. Users on satellite internet links for example (where bandwidth is charged by the megabyte) can achieve full return on investment within months of deployment.
 Education: Through strategic partnerships with content providers (such as Pearson), LEA and Regional Broadband Consortia ApplianSys holds a large share of the UK education caching market.

In 2005 it launched the Becta approved Protex content filtering service in collaboration with the East of England Broadband Network, who represent more than 2800 schools across 10 authorities. In 2006, it acquired the assets and customer base of its rival Freedom2. It has since expanded activity into the North American schools market and was the caching device most requested by US schools for 2015 E-rate funding.

Operating system
ApplianSys maintains its own hardened Linux operating system that has been developed from the ground up with appliance use in mind. All products make use of industrial grade CFast that in most cases stores both the OS and configuration files, minimising or removing reliance on non solid state storage for reasons of both performance and reliability.

After initial deployment using a VGA or serial console, all configuration of ApplianSys products is performed via a secure web interface.

References

External links
 

Networking companies
Companies established in 2000
Companies based in Coventry
Linux-based devices
Domain Name System
Cache (computing)
Server appliance
WAN optimization